"Courtship Dating" was the first single on the debut album by Ontario music group Crystal Castles. The single was released on March 31, 2008 although the song had leaked in 2006. According to vocalist Alice Glass, the song "is about human taxidermy, the idea of preserving the beauty of a lover the way you would an animal".

Reception
"Courtship Dating" was received positively by critics, with NME describing it as "synth-pop filled up with muted screams, jerking bass and sparking circuit boards" and "the best piece of humanity-loathing cyborg pop since The Knife's Silent Shout".

Track listing

7": Play It Again Sam UK

7": Last Gang Canada

Accolades

References

Crystal Castles (band) songs
2008 singles
2007 songs
Songs written by Ethan Kath